Christella is a genus of around 70-80 species of ferns in the subfamily Thelypteridoideae of the family Thelypteridaceae in the Pteridophyte Phylogeny Group classification of 2016 (PPG I). Other sources sink Christella into a very broadly defined genus Thelypteris. The genus was named after Konrad H. Christ, a Swiss botanist.  The distribution of these plants is mostly in the tropics and sub tropical areas. An Australian example is C. dentata.

Species
, the Checklist of Ferns and Lycophytes of the World accepted the following species:

Christella abrupta (C.Presl) A.R.Sm.
Christella acuminata (Houtt.) Holttum
Christella adenopelta Holttum
Christella afzelii (C.Chr.) Holttum
Christella albicaulis (Fée) comb. ined.
Christella altissima Holttum
Christella appendiculata (Wall. ex C.Presl) Holttum
Christella arida (D.Don) Holttum
Christella augescens (Link) Pic.Serm.
Christella balansae (Ching) Holttum
Christella berroi (C.Chr.) Salino & A.R.Sm.
Christella boninensis (Kodama ex Koidz.) Holttum
Christella boydiae (D.C.Eaton) Holttum
Christella buchananii (Schelpe) J.P.Roux
Christella burmanica (Ching) Holttum
Christella burundensis Pic.Serm.
Christella calcarea Glenny
Christella callensii (Alston) Holttum
Christella calvescens (Ching) Holttum
Christella carolinensis (Hosok.) Holttum
Christella chaseana (Schelpe) Holttum
Christella clarkei (Bedd.) Holttum
Christella clivalis (A.R.Sm.) A.R.Sm.
Christella connexa (Kuhn ex Baker) comb. ined.
Christella conspersa (Schrad.) Á.Löve & D.Löve
Christella cretacea (A.R.Sm.) Á.Löve & D.Löve
Christella crinipes (Hook.) Holttum
Christella cyatheoides (Kaulf.) Holttum
Christella darainensis Rakotondr.
Christella dentata (Forssk.) Brownsey & Jermy
Christella distans (Hook.) Holttum
Christella ensifera (Tagawa) Holttum ex C.M.Kuo et al.
Christella evoluta (C.B.Clarke ex Bedd.) Holttum
Christella friesii (Brause) Holttum
Christella fukienensis (Ching) Holttum
Christella goedenii (Rosenst.) comb. ined.
Christella gretheri (W.H.Wagner) Holttum
Christella guamensis Holttum
Christella gueinziana (Mett.) Holttum
Christella guineensis (Christ) Holttum
Christella gustavii (Bedd.) Holttum
Christella harveyi (Mett. ex Kuhn) Holttum
Christella hokouensis (Ching) Holttum
Christella jaculosa (Christ) Holttum
Christella kendujharensis S.K.Behera & S.K.Barik
Christella lanosa (C.Chr.) Á.Löve & D.Löve
Christella latipinna (Benth.) H.Lév.
Christella lebeufii (Baker) Holttum
Christella meeboldii (Rosenst.) Holttum
Christella microbasis (Baker) Holttum
Christella minima Holttum
Christella modesta Holttum
Christella moluccana M.Kato
Christella multiauriculata Punetha
Christella multifrons (C.Chr.) Holttum
Christella namburensis (Bedd.) Holttum
Christella nana Holttum
Christella normalis (C.Chr.) Holttum
Christella oblancifolia (Tagawa) comb. ined.
Christella oligophylla (Maxon) Brade
Christella ovata (R.P.St. John) Á.Löve & D.Löve
Christella pacifica Holttum
Christella papilio (C.Hope) Holttum
Christella parasitica (L.) H.Lév.
Christella patens (Sw.) Holttum
Christella peekelii (Alderw.) Holttum
Christella perpubescens (Alston) Holttum
Christella prolixa (Willd.) Holttum
Christella pseudogueinziana (Bonap.) J.P.Roux
Christella puberula (Baker) Á.Löve & D.Löve
Christella quadrangularis (Fée) Holttum
Christella rupicola (Hosok.) Holttum
Christella scaberula (Ching) Holttum
Christella schizotis (Hook.) A.R.Sm.
Christella semisagittata (Roxb. ex Griff.) Holttum
Christella serra (Sw.) Holttum
Christella subdentata Holttum
Christella subelata (Baker) Holttum
Christella subjuncta (Baker) Holttum
Christella subpubescens (Blume) Holttum
Christella timorensis Holttum
Christella tuerckheiimii (Donn. Sm.) comb. ined.
Christella wailele (Flynn) D.D.Palmer

References 

Thelypteridaceae
Fern genera